False box or false boxwood is a common name for several plants and may refer to:

Cornus florida, native to eastern North America and northern Mexico
Gyminda
Paxistima myrsinites, native to western North America